James Couper may refer to:

James Couper (politician) (1870–1946), Scottish politician
James Couper (rugby union) (1873–1917), Scotland international rugby union player
James Couper (astronomer) (1752–1836), professor of astronomy at the University of Glasgow
James Hamilton Couper (1794–1866), American malacologist
James Couper, of the Couper baronets
James Couper (academic), identified Manganism

See also

James Cooper (disambiguation)
Couper (disambiguation)